The Syrian Space Agency is a government run organization overseen by the Syrian Minister of Communications and Technology, Iyad Mohammed al Khatib, and dedicated to space exploration.

History 
 On the 18th of March 2014, and after three years of Syrian civil war, the government announces the creation of the Syrian Space Agency.
 On the 19th of August 2016, the Syrian Government and the Russian Government signed an agreement pledging cooperation in the areas of Space Research and Remote Sensing. It was signed by the general director of the authority for remote sensing, Dr Osama-al Ammar, on the Syrian side, and Igor Komarov, the head of Roscosmos, on the Russian side.
 On the 11th of December 2018, the Syrian Minister of Communications and Technology, Iyad Khatib, said during a visit to space research facilities that "a road map for the Syrian space program, as well as for the launch of the first artificial satellite into Earth’s orbit" should be developed.

See also 
 General Organization of Remote Sensing

References 

Government agencies established in 2014
Space agencies
Government of Syria
Science and technology in Syria